George Fielding Blandford  (1829–1911) was a British physician, known as a psychiatrist. He was author of Insanity and its Treatment (1871), which went through four editions and was translated into German.

Biography
After education from 1840 to 1841 at Tonbridge School and from 1841 to 1848 at Rugby School, G. Fielding Blandford matriculated in 1848 at Wadham College, Oxford, graduating BA in 1852 and MA in 1857. In October 1852 he began the study of medicine at St George's Hospital, London, graduating BM (Oxon.) in 1857. In 1857 he also qualified LSA. He qualified MRCS in 1858 and MRCP in 1860.

In 1857 Blandford sometimes took holiday duty (on an unofficial basis) at St Luke's Hospital, where he became a friend of several of the medical staff, including Alexander John Sutherland. Sutherland was the owner of Blacklands House, a London private asylum for gentlemen. Blandford was from 1859 to 1863 resident medical officer at Blacklands House and then in 1863 resigned his appointment to go into private consulting practice.

From 1865 to 1902 he was lecturer on psychological medicine at St George's Hospital. In 1869 he was elected FRCP. In 1877 he was president of the Medico-Psychological Association. In 1895 he gave the Lumleian Lectures on The Diagnosis, Prognosis, and Prophylaxis of Insanity.

His private practice, begun in 1863, was first in Clarges Street, then in Grosvenor Street, and finally at 48 Wimpole Street, and rapidly became large with an excellent reputation. In 1909 he retired from his London practice to live at Tunbridge Wells. He was a leading authority on legislation dealing with mental illness. His book Insanity and its Treatment maintained an international reputation for twenty years.

He was a member of the Athenaeum Club, London.

Family
In 1864 in Amersham, Buckinghamshire, G. Fielding Blandford married Louisa Holloway. They had two sons and two daughters. The elder son, Walter Fielding Holloway Blandford (1864–1952), became a lecturer in entomology and then worked as a law clerk and solicitor. The younger son, Maurice Fielding Holloway Blandford (1866–1957), married Louisa Kathleen Robinson in 1899. The elder daughter, Violet Elsie Fielding Blandford, was born in 1873. The younger daughter, Katherine Fielding Blandford, was born in 1871. When he died in 1911, G. Fielding Blandford was survived by his widow and all four of his children.

Selected publications

References

1829 births
1911 deaths
19th-century English medical doctors
20th-century English medical doctors
People educated at Tonbridge School
People educated at Rugby School
Alumni of Wadham College, Oxford
Alumni of St George's, University of London
Fellows of the Royal College of Physicians
British psychiatrists